The Red Deer Royals are a Concert and Marching band based in the City of Red Deer, Alberta, Canada. They are Central Alberta's only Marching band for youth aged between 11 and 21. The Royals have been performing for the past 50 years and are currently under the direction of Michael Mann. They go on international tours every two to three years with the most recent tour to Europe in which the band competed in WMC kerkrade, Netherlands

Members

The Band draws from 90 to 120 of Central Alberta's most ambitious young musicians to come together annually to create this community based marching show band. The Royals have members aged as young as 11 all the way up to 21 and they currently represent 20 School Band programs from the Central Alberta region. The members travel from many cities of Central Alberta, some as far south as Carstairs, Alberta, as far north as Edmonton, Alberta, as far west as Rocky Mountain House, and as far east as Stettler, Alberta. The band is composed of four groups; woodwinds, brass, percussion, and colour guard.

Concert Season

From September to March, the Red Deer Royals perform as a concert band, performing at many different venues. They play for Remembrance Day ceremonies, Christmas festivals, and various events around Red Deer. During the concert season, the band is conducted by Michael Mann. Each year there is a concert master and assistant concert master selected to direct the band for a song.

Parade Season

Starting in May the Red Deer Royals perform in parades throughout Central Alberta. Some of the locations of their parades are smaller rural communities such as Blackfalds, Sylvan Lake and Rocky Mountain House, but are also involved in the parades in the larger cities including Calgary, Edmonton, and (of course) Red Deer. In most of the smaller parades they are the only marching band performing; but larger and more advertised parades, such as the Calgary Stampede Parade, attract bands from across Canada, the continental U.S., and sometimes are honored to welcome performances from other bands and groups from overseas. The Red Deer Royals spend a great deal of time rehearsing their parade songs, incorporating actions into some of their songs, to be used in competition.

Recent Awards

At the 2008 Calgary Stampede Parade, the Red Deer Royals won the following awards: Best Canadian Band, Best Senior Band, and Best Overall Band, as well as third place for Best Auxiliary.

At the 2008 and the 2009 Edmonton Capital Ex Parade, the Royals were judged as the best marching band and were also the musical Grand Champions, winning the Sig Hansen Musical Award.

In 2014 the Red Deer Royals received second place in Italy for their show: Search For Paradise Reef, while an Italian marching band took first.

Directors

Throughout the Band's history there have been six Band Directors

2012–present Michael Mann

2001–2012 Rob Goring

1991-2001 Keith Mann

Keith Mann was honored for his work in the community and for the Royals in 2004 with a statue located in Red Deer City Hall Park and the Red Deer Royals performed at the unveiling his favorite piece, Unchained Melody.

1977-1991 A.L. Jigger Lee

1973-1977 Frank Connell

1971-1973 Richard Campion

1969-1971 Vic Wright

International Tours

1976 England

1984 California (San Francisco, Disneyland, San Diego)

1986 Expo (Vancouver) Alaska cruise

1990 Disney World Florida

1992 California and Mexico

1994 North Dakota

1995 Australia

1998 England and France (WAMSB Championships London)

2001 Netherlands and Germany (WMC Kerkrade, WAMSB Championships Potsdam)

2003 Italy (WAMSB Championships Monza)

2006 Australia

2009 Netherlands, Ireland and Germany (Joint WMC/WAMSB Championships Kerkrade)

2011 Malaysia, Kuala Lumpur (WAMSB Championships)

2014 Italy

2017 Europe, Germany, Netherlands WMC

2019 England and Ireland (Celtic Band Festival)

References

External links
Red Deer Community Band Society, Red Deer, Alberta, Canada
The World Association of Marching Show Bands (WAMSB)
The World Music Contest 2009 (WMC)

Canadian marching bands
Red Deer, Alberta
Musical groups from Alberta
Musical groups established in 1969
1969 establishments in Alberta